Phasmophaga is a genus of parasitic flies in the family Tachinidae.

Species
Phasmophaga americana (Coquillett, 1897)
Phasmophaga antennalis Townsend, 1909
Phasmophaga floridensis (Greene, 1934)
Phasmophaga meridionalis Townsend, 1909
Phasmophaga phasmophagae (Cortés, 1968)

References

Diptera of South America
Diptera of North America
Exoristinae
Tachinidae genera
Taxa named by Charles Henry Tyler Townsend